Zhang Zhigang (born November 1964) is a Chinese engineer and executive who is the current general manager of the State Grid Corporation of China, in office since May 2021.

Biography 
Zhang was born in November 1964, and graduated from Tsinghua University. He entered the workforce in July 1987. He served as deputy general manager of the State Grid Corporation of China in September 2017, and in May 2021 was promoted to the general manager position.

References 

1964 births
Living people
Tsinghua University alumni
Chinese engineers
Alternate members of the 20th Central Committee of the Chinese Communist Party